Found Memories is a 2011 Brazilian drama film directed by Júlia Murat. It won the Best Narrative Feature Jury Award at the 2012 RiverRun International Film Festival.

Plot
Life in the secluded village of Jotuomba is dictated by the rituals of its aged population. When Rita, a young photographer, comes to town, she disrupts these rituals, wakes this sleepy village, and questions a secret long since locked away in the village cemetery.

Cast
 Lisa Fávero as Rita
 Sonia Guedes as Madalena
 Ricardo Merkin
 Luiz Serra as Antonio

References

External links
 

2011 films
2011 drama films
Brazilian drama films
2010s Portuguese-language films